At Ease with Coleman Hawkins (also referred to as Moodsville 7) is an album by saxophonist Coleman Hawkins which was recorded in 1960 and released on the Moodsville label.

Reception

Scott Yanow of AllMusic states, "this CD is more successful as pleasant background music than as creative jazz".

Track listing
 "For You, For Me, For Evermore" (George Gershwin, Ira Gershwin) – 6:07
 "While We're Young" (William Engvick, Morty Palitz, Alec Wilder) – 3:33
 "Then I'll Be Tired of You" (Yip Harburg, Arthur Schwartz) – 5:08
 "Mighty Like a Rose" (Ethelbert Nevin, Frank Lebby Stanton) – 4:00
 "At Dawning" (Charles Wakefield Cadman) – 4:39
 "Trouble Is a Man" (Alec Wilder) – 5:25
 "Poor Butterfly" (John Golden, Raymond Hubbell) – 6:06
 "I'll Get By (As Long as I Have You)" (Fred E. Ahlert, Roy Turk) – 6:36

Personnel
Coleman Hawkins – tenor saxophone
Tommy Flanagan – piano
Wendell Marshall – bass
Osie Johnson – drums

References

Coleman Hawkins albums
1960 albums
Moodsville Records albums
Albums recorded at Van Gelder Studio
Albums produced by Esmond Edwards